Petar Čortanović or Čortanovački (Чортановачки, 1800–1868) was a Serbian painter.
He painted the wall frescoes of the Buđanovci Church in 1838, of the Karlovčić Church in 1845. In 1856 he painted the Battle of Kosovo and members of the Lazarević dynasty.

See also

Pavle Čortanović
List of painters from Serbia

References

19th-century Serbian people
Serbian painters